The 2017–18 season of Levante UD Femenino was the 19th season of the women's team of football club Levante UD. The team was 8th in Primera División and a quarterfinalist in the Copa de la Reina.

Season summary
Levante had ended the previous season's championship in the 4th position, same as in 2015–16, ending the league campaign on a positive note by defeating Barcelona, which needed a victory and an Atlético Madrid miss to win the title, after a 4-game away losing streak including a record 6–0 defeat against local rival Valencia in Mestalla before an attendance of 17,000. Valencia ended the competition third with an unseen 11 point advantage over Levante.

Few days later it was reported in the media that the squad's captains had expressed a lack of tune with manager Andrés Tudela, who had its contract renewed for two more seasons in April, along with objections to the planning of the trainings and an alleged lack of functionality in the section's structure in a meeting with the club's chairman, Quico Catalán. After a loss against lower-ranked Granadilla in the Copa de la Reina's quarterfinals against lower-ranked Granadilla put an end to the season, it was reported that this rift would likely result in the departure of over half the squad.

In the end ten players left the team in the summer transfer market, including internationals Noelia Bermúdez, Raquel Infante, Olivia Oprea, Nagore Calderón, Adriana Martín and María José Pérez, with Bermúdez joining Valencia along with Andrea Esteban. Levante signed Noelia Ramos, Patricia Padilla, Natalia Ramos, Alba Aznar, Marta Cardona and 6-times league champion Miriam Diéguez within Primera División, and Greta Espinoza, 2017 Euro finalist Sofie Junge Pedersen and Jéssica Silva from abroad. After five seasons working on a €250,000 budget, the team's was increased to €300,000, the highest in nearly a decade.

Levante won 7 of the 13 first games of the championship, settling in the 4th position near the halfway point of the league with two victories over direct rivals Athletic Bilbao and Valencia. However, two wide losses against Atlético and Barcelona started a 5-games losing streak and by February the team had plummeted to the 8th position. On February 13, Andrés Tudela was sacked following a draw against newly-promoted Madrid. It was the third dismissal of a manager in the campaign, after Real Sociedad's Juanjo Arregi and Madrid's Jesús Núñez.

Tudela was replaced by Kino García, the coach of the section's B team. After a 0–6 debut rout over Espanyol, the team attained an essential three home games winning streak, but lost the remaining seven games in the championship and ended it in the 8th spot, barely qualifying for the Copa de la Reina on the head-to-head over Sporting Huelva thanks to Madrid losing its last game. This was Levante's worst result in the championship since the 2010–11 season, after six seasons always ending either 4th or 5th. Charlyn Corral scored 25 goals, more than those scored by the rest of the team combined, and she was the top scorer of the championship with a five goals over Atlético's Sonia Bermúdez. She is to become the second Mexican player awarded the Pichichi Trophy after Hugo Sánchez.

In the Copa de la Reina Levante faced defending champion Barcelona in the quarterfinals, and lost both games by single goals scored by former Levante player Alexia Putellas.

Transfers

Results

Pre-season

Primera División

Copa de la Reina

Primera División statistics

References 

2017–18 in Spanish women's football
Levante Femenino
Levante UD Femenino seasons